Right Now is a 2004 French film by director Benoît Jacquot. It was screened in the Un Certain Regard section at the 2004 Cannes Film Festival.

Plot
In 1975, a young bourgeois woman falls in love with a bank robber. She follows him and his partner on the run after a bank heist resulted in a death and hostage taking. Using fake IDs, they leave Paris and travel to Spain, Morocco, and Greece.

Cast
 Isild Le Besco as Lili 
 Ouassini Embarek as Bada 
 Nicolas Duvauchelle as Alain 
 Laurence Cordier as Joelle 
 Odile Vuillemin
 Emmanuelle Bercot as Laurence

Reception
On review aggregator website Rotten Tomatoes, the film holds an approval rating of 70%, based on 44 reviews, and an average rating of 6.6/10. The website's critical consensus reads, "A mesmerizing performance by ingenue Isild Le Besco makes this stylish French drama a taut, compelling escapade." On Metacritic, the film has a weighted average score of 63 out of 100, based on 19 critics, indicating "generally favorable reviews".

References

External links
 

2004 films
Films directed by Benoît Jacquot
2000s crime films
French crime films
French black-and-white films
2000s French-language films
2000s French films